Mary Ann Evans (8 January 1908 – 9 January 1996), also known by her stage name Fearless Nadia, was an Australian-born actress and stuntwoman, who worked in Indian cinema. She is most remembered as the masked, cloaked adventurer in Hunterwali, released in 1935, which was one of the earliest female-lead Indian films. She is often referred to as a sex symbol.

Biography

Early life
Fearless Nadia was born as Mary Ann Evans on 8 January 1908 in Perth, Western Australia. She was the daughter of Scotsman Herbertt Evans, a volunteer in the British Army, and Margret. They lived in Australia, before coming to India. Mary was one year old when Herbertt's regiment was seconded to Bombay. Mary came to Bombay in 1913 at the age of five with her father.

In 1915, her father’s untimely death at the hands of  Germans during World War I prompted the family’s move to Peshawar (now in Pakistan). She learnt horseback riding, hunting, fishing, and shooting during a stay in the North-West Frontier Province (now Khyber Pakhtunkhwa). In 1928, she returned to Bombay (Mumbai) with her mother and a son, Robert Jones, about whom not much is known, and then studied ballet under Madam Astrova.

She had earlier tried her hand at a job in the Army & Navy Store in Bombay (Mumbai) as a salesgirl and had at one point wanted to learn "short-hand and typing to get a better job". Astrova’s troupe performed for British soldiers at military bases, for Indian royalty, and for other crowd in  small towns and villages. She mastered the art of cartwheels and splits, which came in handy later during her film stunts. An Armenian fortune teller had foretold that a successful career lay ahead but she would have to choose a name starting with the letter ‘N’. She chose the name Nadia because it was "exotic-sounding".

Career of Tapasree

She toured India as a theatre artist and began working for Zarko Circus in 1930. She was introduced to Hindi films by Jamshed "J.B.H." Wadia who was the founder of Wadia Movietone, the behemoth of stunts and action in 1930s Bombay. At first, J.B.H. was bemused at Mary's insistence on trying out for the movies, but he took a gamble by giving her a cameo as a slave girl  (in a hand-painted colour sequence that accentuated her blonde hair and sparkling blue eyes) in the film Desh Deepak, and then as Princess Parizaad in Noor-e-Yaman. Nadia proved a huge hit with the audience, whereupon, considering her skills at performing circus and other stunts, J.B.H., by then joined by his younger brother Homi, chose to develop her into a star. In 1967-68, when she was in her late 50s, she appeared in a James Bond spoof called Khiladi (The Player).

Personal life
Nadia married Homi Wadia in 1961 and thus became Nadia Wadia.

Death
Nadia died on 9 January 1996, a day after her 88th birthday, due to age-related diseases.

Legacy
In 1993, Nadia's great grandnephew, Riyad Vinci Wadia, made a documentary of her life and films, called Fearless: The Hunterwali Story. After watching the documentary at the 1993 Berlin International Film Festival, Dorothee Wenner, a German freelance writer, and film curator, wrote Fearless Nadia - The true story of Bollywood's original stunt queen, which was subsequently translated into English in 2005. In Vishal Bharadwaj's Hindi film Rangoon, the role played by Kangana Ranaut was inspired by Nadia.

On 8 January 2018, Google displayed a doodle paying tribute to Fearless Nadia’s 110th birthday. The artist commissioned for the doodle was the Indian comic illustrator Devaki Neogi.

Filmography (selected)

References

External links

Hunterwali images
Fearless Nadia

1908 births
1996 deaths
Actresses from Perth, Western Australia
Australian film actresses
Australian stunt performers
Indian film actresses
Indian stunt performers
Australian emigrants to India
Australian expatriate actresses in India
Actresses in Hindi cinema
People with acquired Indian citizenship
People who lost Australian citizenship
Wadia family
20th-century Australian actresses